Edward Smyth (1749 – 2 August 1812) was an Irish sculptor.

The son of a stone-cutter, Smyth was born in Meath, Ireland.  He was employed by Henry Darley, who was in turn an employee of James Gandon. By this connection Smyth met Gandon who was greatly impressed with his work.  Gandon employed Smyth as sculptor to the Custom House as well as for all of his Dublin projects. These included the Four Courts, House of Lords, and King's Inns.

Smyth in 1787 completed statues to his own design above the Westmoreland St entrance (the "Lords' Entrance", which was added by Gandon) of the Irish Houses of Parliament. In 1807 he carved the statues above the main entrance of the same building (which had been taken over by the Bank of Ireland) on College Green. These represent Hibernia flanked by Commerce and Fidelity.

Smyth was also employed by the architect Francis Johnston. He carved the heads on the exterior of Johnston's Chapel Royal in Dublin Castle until his death, whereupon his son John continued the work.

Smyth was the first Master of the Dublin Society School of Modeling and sculpture. He died suddenly on 2 August 1812, at his home at 36 Montgomery Street in Dublin. His son, John Smyth, was also a sculptor and succeeded him as Master of Modeling at the Dublin School. Several of his works were renovated in the 20th century by his great-grandson, George Smyth.

References

1749 births
1812 deaths
Irish sculptors
People from County Meath